Aornum was an oracle in Ancient Greece, located in Thesprotia in a cave called Charonium which gave forth poisonous vapours. The name of the cave, "Charon's Cave", reflects the belief that it was an entrance for Hades, the Greek underworld. In a version of the myth, Orpheus travels to Aornum to recover his wife, Eurydice, from Hades.

See also
Leibethra
Pimpleia

References

External links
 Greek Mythology Link, Orpheus

Classical oracles
Death in Greek mythology
Geography of ancient Epirus
Locations in Greek mythology
Orpheus
Thesprotia